The Geelong Racecourse is a major regional horse racing venue in Geelong, Victoria, Australia. The current racecourse dates to 1908. The annual Geelong Cup is held at the course every October, as well as a number of other race meets through the year.

History
The first race meet in Geelong was on 1 May 1841, at Corio. Three races were held on the day. The next meet was held at "Airey's Flat" on the banks the Moorabool River near Fyansford. Situated close to Lake Connewarre, the land was subject to frequent flooding.

The Geelong Racing Club was formed in 1866, holding its first meet on 18 and 19 January 1866. 23 February 1872 saw the first Geelong Cup held at the Marshalltown course, where a new grandstand was opened. A railway branch line was provided to the course in 1878. In 1907, it was decided to relocate the Geelong Racecourse and Geelong Showgrounds to their current site on Breakwater Road, East Geelong. The first race meeting was held at the new venue in March 1908, with the first Geelong Racing Club meet being held there on 12 December 1908. The Geelong Racecourse railway station was also provided at that time. The Geelong Racing Club, the Geelong Agricultural Society and the Hibernian Society together paid the Victorian Railways £1000 to have the station built.

The course itself has seen a number of upgrades, the most recent being the provision of a third grandstand and an upgrade of the track itself.

External links
 Geelong Racing Club

References
Peter Begg (1990). Geelong - The First 150 Years. Globe Press. ISBN 0-9592863-5-7

Horse racing venues in Australia
Buildings and structures in Geelong
Sport in Geelong
Tourist attractions in Geelong
Sports venues in Victoria (Australia)
1908 establishments in Australia
Sports venues completed in 1908